Cremastocheilus armatus is a species of fruit or flower chafer in the family Scarabaeidae.

Subspecies
 Cremastocheilus armatus armatus Walker, 1866
 Cremastocheilus armatus cribripennis Casey, 1915
 Cremastocheilus armatus maritimus Casey, 1915
 Cremastocheilus armatus montanus CASEY, 1915

References

Further reading

 
 
 

Cetoniinae
Beetles described in 1866